Coenypha is a genus of South American crab spiders that was first described by Eugène Louis Simon in 1895.

Species
 it contains seven species, found in Chile:
Coenypha antennata (Tullgren, 1902) (type) – Chile
Coenypha ditissima (Nicolet, 1849) (type) – Chile
Coenypha edwardsi (Nicolet, 1849) (type) – Chile
Coenypha fasciata Mello-Leitão, 1926 – Chile
Coenypha fuliginosa (Nicolet, 1849) – Chile
Coenypha lucasi (Nicolet, 1849) – Chile
Coenypha nodosa (Nicolet, 1849) – Chile

See also
 List of Thomisidae species

References

Further reading

Araneomorphae genera
Spiders of South America
Thomisidae
Endemic fauna of Chile